For the interview program of the same name, see Hollywood Star Time (interview program).

Hollywood Star Time was a radio dramatic anthology series in the United States. It was broadcast on CBS January 6, 1946 – March 27, 1947.

Format
A newspaper article announcing the debut of Hollywood Star Time described it as "featuring big-name movie talent and hit films." The first episode featured Tyrone Power and Jeanne Crain starring in Seventh Heaven. Other works presented on the program and leading actors in them included the following:
The Song of Bernadette – Lee J. Cobb and Vanessa Brown
Riders of the Purple Sage – George Montgomery and Lynn Bari
The Lodger – Vincent Price
The Lady Eve - Joan Blondell and John Lund
Talk of the Town – Cary Grant, Herbert Marshall and Marguerite Chapman

Hollywood Star Time was one of several radio programs classified as "prestige drama". That genre included The Screen Guild Theater, Hollywood Premiere, Academy Award Theater, The Dreft Star Playhouse, and the Screen Directors' Playhouse. Radio historian John Dunning evaluated Hollywood Star Time by writing, "Its production was the equal of Screen Guild and a notch or so behind Lux."

Personnel
By its nature, a program like Hollywood Star Time had few people who appeared regularly. The spotlight was on guest stars, who varied from week to week. Nevertheless, a few people did have continuing roles. Beginning October 12, 1946, Herbert Marshall was the program's permanent host. The other person heard regularly on the program was announcer Wendell Niles.

Behind the scenes, Robert Redd and Jack Johnstone were directors, and Alfred Newman was composer-conductor. Milton Geiger wrote the scripts.

Tie-ins with studios
Early on, Hollywood Star Time had a business arrangement with 20th Century Fox whereby the program had exclusive rights to use of the studio's movies in return for free plugs on broadcasts. Fox apparently was not satisfied with the arrangement, however, and dropped it at the end of 13 weeks. Later, the program obtained an agreement with Universal-International for "exclusive rights to a series of U-I properties for consecutive presentation."

See also
Academy Award Theater
Brownstone Theater
The Dreft Star Playhouse
Screen Directors' Playhouse
The Screen Guild Theater

References

External links 
 Episodic log of Hollywood Star Time from Jerry Haendiges Vintage Radio Logs
 Streaming episodes of Hollywood Star Time from the Internet Archive
 Streaming episodes of Hollywood Star Time from the Old Time Radio Researchers Group

1940s American radio programs
American radio dramas
CBS Radio programs
1946 radio programme debuts
1947 radio programme endings